Thomas Poll (born 28 August 2001) is a Dutch professional footballer who plays for as a left-back for Eerste Divisie club Almere City.

Career

Groningen
Born in Amsterdam, Poll moved with his family to Wehe-den Hoorn, Province of Groningen when he was 8 years old. He initially joined VV Eenrum and moved to VV Winsum only one year later. At the age of 14, Poll was admitted to the FC Groningen youth academy, and progressed through the youth teams.

He made his professional debut on 28 February 2020 as a starter in the Eredivisie match against Willem II. Groningen lost 1–3.

On 9 October 2020, Poll signed a new contract with Groningen until 2022. Three months later, he was sent on loan to Dordrecht for the remainder of the 2020–21 season. He made 18 appearances during his loan, making two assists.

Almere City
On 31 August 2021, Poll signed a three-year contract with Eerste Divisie club Almere City. He made his debut on 10 September, coming on as a half-time substitute for Thibaut Lesquoy in a 1–1 draw against Telstar.

Poll scored his first goal on senior level against Jong AZ in stoppage time after coming on as a substitute for Lance Duijvestijn on 22 August 2022. On 30 September, he scored the late 2–1 winner in a league game against Roda JC Kerkrade.

Career statistics

Notes

References

External links

Living people
2001 births
Footballers from Amsterdam
Association football defenders
Dutch footballers
FC Groningen players
FC Dordrecht players
Almere City FC players
Eredivisie players
Eerste Divisie players
Derde Divisie players